This is a list of presidential trips made by Joe Biden during 2023, the third year of his presidency as the 46th president of the United States.

This list excludes trips made within Washington, D.C., the U.S. federal capital in which the White House, the official residence and principal workplace of the president, is located. Also excluded are trips to Camp David, the country residence of the president. International trips are included. The number of visits per state or territory where he traveled are:

 One: Alabama, Florida, Georgia, Kentucky, Nevada, Ohio, Texas, the U.S. Virgin Islands and Wisconsin
 Two: California, New York and Virginia
 Three: Pennsylvania
 Five: Maryland
 Ten: Delaware

January

February

March

Future trips

See also
 Presidency of Joe Biden
 List of international presidential trips made by Joe Biden
 List of presidential trips made by Joe Biden

References

Presidential travels of Joe Biden
2023 in American politics
2023 in international relations
2023-related lists
Lists of events in the United States
Joe Biden-related lists